Brace Yourself may refer to:

Music
Brace Yourself (album), by Dropping Daylight, 2006
Brace Yourself (EP), by μ-ziq (Mike Paradinas), 1998
"Brace Yourself", a song by Howie Day from Stop All the World Now, 2003
"Brace Yourself", a song by A Loss for Words, 2013
"Brace Yourself", a video shown at the beginning of concerts during Michael Jackson's Dangerous World Tour, 1992–1993

Other uses
"Brace Yourself" (Braceface), a 2001 TV episode
"Brace Yourself" (The Brady Bunch), a 1970 TV episode
Brace Yourself Games, developer of the 2015 video game Crypt of the NecroDancer